Alkalihalobacillus trypoxylicola is a bacterium from the genus of Alkalihalobacillus which has been isolated from the gut of a larvae beetle (Trypoxylus dichotomus septentrionalis).

References

Bacillaceae
Bacteria described in 2010